Sharlene Natasha Whyte (born 19 May 1976) is an English actress who is best known for playing Jenny Edwards in The Story of Tracy Beaker and Adanna Lawal, the Head of Pastoral Care, in Waterloo Road. She trained at RADA from 1996 till 1999.

Filmography

Television

Film

References

External links

Living people
1976 births
Actresses from Nottinghamshire
Alumni of RADA
Black British actresses
English people of Grenadian descent